The Indian locomotive class XA was a class of light axle load  "Pacific" type steam locomotives used on  broad gauge lines in British India, and then in post-partition India and Pakistan.

The 113 members of the class were built by Vulcan Foundry in Newton-le-Willows, Lancashire, England, in 1929/31, 1931 and 1935.

Upon partition in 1947, a total of 37 members of the class went to Pakistan. The other 76 remained in India.

Preservation
Only two XA's are preserved XA 22002 is preserved at the Railway Institute Chandausi. while XA 22046 is preserved.

See also

Rail transport in India#History
History of rail transport in Pakistan
Indian Railways
Locomotives of India
Pakistan Railways

References

Bibliography

External links

Railway locomotives introduced in 1931
XA
XA
Vulcan Foundry locomotives
4-6-2 locomotives
5 ft 6 in gauge locomotives
Passenger locomotives